Ulrich Kévin Mayi (born 14 January 1993) is a professional footballer who plays as a striker for Turkish club Denizlispor. Born in France, he represents the Gabon national team.

Career 
Mayi made his professional debut on 7 May 2012 in a league match against Marseille appearing as a substitute.

In August 2014, he joined Gazélec Ajaccio, newly promoted to Ligue 2, on a season-long contract.

In July 2016, Mayi signed with Eredivisie side NEC.

International career
Born in France, Mayi is of Gabonese descent. He is a youth international for France. He debuted for the Gabon national team in a 3–0 2021 Africa Cup of Nations qualification win over DR Congo on 25 March 2021.

Career statistics

Club

Notes

References

External links 
 
 
 
 

1993 births
Living people
Footballers from Lyon
Gabonese footballers
Gabon international footballers
French footballers
France youth international footballers
French sportspeople of Gabonese descent
People with acquired Gabonese citizenship
Association football forwards
AS Saint-Étienne players
Chamois Niortais F.C. players
Gazélec Ajaccio players
NEC Nijmegen players
Stade Brestois 29 players
Denizlispor footballers
Ligue 1 players
Ligue 2 players
Eredivisie players
2021 Africa Cup of Nations players
Ümraniyespor footballers
Black French sportspeople